Herbert B. Schmidt (born 23 April 1931 in East Prussia) is a German economist and public policy advisor, best known for his work in privatization in the former East Germany and Eastern Europe.

Schmidt is considered the author of the "German Method" of privatization, in which shares of a state-owned company are tendered to the private sector buyer offering the best bid considering a number of factors including price, numbers of jobs guaranteed, environmental remediation, and other concerns.  Schmidt was the chief privatization advisor to Estonian Prime Minister Maart Laar, and is a former economics minister of the German Lander of Saxony.  From 1998 to 2001, he was Commissioner of the Securities Commission of Bosnia and Herzegovina.

In 1998, he was awarded the Order of the White Star of Estonia for his work with the German Treuhandanstalt in Estonia.

References

Further reading
Methods of Privatization, Andrew Berg and Elliot Berg, Journal of International Affairs, Vol. 50, 1997.
Soziale Marktwirtschaft als Historische Weichenstellung, "Methodenfragen der Privatisierung, dargestellt am Beispeil Estland", Herbert B. Schmidt.  Ludwig-Erhard-Siftung, Bonn 1996.
Alfred Müller-Armack/Herbert B. Schmidt (Hg.): Wirtschafts- und Finanzpolitik im Zeichen der sozialen Marktwirtschaft. Festgabe für Franz Etzel, Stuttgart-Degerloch 1967

German economists
1931 births
Living people